Halfing is a municipality in the district of Rosenheim in Bavaria in Germany. It is located in the western part of the Chiemgau area, half-way between Chiemsee and Wasserburg am Inn.

History 
The village was mentioned first in a deed from 928 when a nobleman gave two villages near Landshut to the archbishop of Salzburg, in exchange for the village of Halfing and its church. In 1400, Halfing had a local court when it was given by Stephen III as a fief to Ortolf den Laiminger. Halfing was then one of the largest settlements in the western part of Chiemgau. 27 farms belonged to Halfing in 1415, and in 1731, when Halfing became a property of Seeon Abbey, the village had still 26 farms.

References

Rosenheim (district)